The 2018 Australian Football League finals series was the 122nd annual edition of the VFL/AFL finals series, the Australian rules football tournament staged to determine the winner of the 2018 AFL season. The finals ran over four weekends in September 2018, culminating with the 2018 AFL Grand Final at the Melbourne Cricket Ground on 29 September 2018.

The top eight teams from the 2018 season qualified for the finals series, which has been played under the current format since 2000.

Qualification

Venues
The matches of the 2018 AFL finals series were contested at three venues around the country. The newly built Perth Stadium hosted its first finals, hosting West Coast's qualifying and preliminary finals. The MCG hosted Richmond's qualifying and preliminary finals, both semi finals (hosted by Hawthorn and Collingwood), as well as Melbourne's elimination final. The SCG hosted its first Sydney derby final.

Matches

The system used for the 2018 AFL finals series is a final eight system. The top four teams in the eight receive the "double chance" when they play in week-one qualifying finals, such that if a top-four team loses in the first week it still remains in the finals, playing a semi-final the next week against the winner of an elimination final. The bottom four of the eight play knock-out games – only the winners survive and move on to the next week. Home-state advantage goes to the team with the higher ladder position in the first two weeks, to the qualifying final winners in the third week.

In the second week, the winners of the qualifying finals receive a bye to the third week. The losers of the qualifying final plays the elimination finals winners in a semi-final. In the third week, the winners of the semi-finals from week two play the winners of the qualifying finals in the first week. The winners of those matches move on to the Grand Final at the MCG in Melbourne.

Week one (qualifying and elimination finals)

First qualifying final (Richmond vs. Hawthorn)
The first qualifying final saw minor premiers and defending premier  defeat the fourth placed  at the MCG in the third-ever Thursday night final and first in Victoria. Despite both clubs' presence in the competition for almost 100 years, this was the first meeting between Richmond and Hawthorn in a final.

Scoreboard

First elimination final (Melbourne vs. Geelong)
The first elimination final was held between fifth placed  and eighth placed  at the MCG.

This marked the eighth final between the two sides, having previously met in a Sectional Round 1 Final in 1900, the 1925 Semi Final, 1937 Semi Final, 1950 First Semi Final, 1954 Preliminary Final, 1989 First Semi Final and 2005 Second Elimination Final.

Scoreboard

Second elimination final (Sydney vs. Greater Western Sydney)
The second elimination final saw  and  face each other in a finals match for the second time in three years, after the two sides had previously met in the 2016 first qualifying final. It was the first finals match between the pair to be played at the Sydney Cricket Ground, after the 2016 final was played at Stadium Australia.

Scoreboard

Second qualifying final (West Coast vs. Collingwood)
The second qualifying final sees second placed  host third-placed  at Optus Stadium; the first final at the new venue. This marks the sixth final between the two sides, having previously contested a qualifying final and replay in 1990, a qualifying final in 1994, a semi final in 2007, a qualifying final in 2011 and a semi final in 2012.

Scoreboard

Week two (semi-finals)

First semi-final (Hawthorn vs. Melbourne)
This was the seventh finals meeting between Hawthorn and Melbourne, and the first since the 1990 elimination final.

Scoreboard

Second semi-final (Collingwood vs. Greater Western Sydney)
This was the first finals meeting between Collingwood and Greater Western Sydney.

Scoreboard

Week three

First preliminary final (Richmond vs. Collingwood)
This was the seventeenth finals meeting between Richmond and Collingwood, and the first since the 1980 Grand Final. Richmond have won nine of those games, while Collingwood have won eight. This was the first time that  has defeated  in a final since 1937.

Scoreboard

Second preliminary final (West Coast vs. Melbourne)
This was the fifth finals meeting between West Coast and Melbourne. The clubs previously met in the 1988 elimination final, the 1990 semi final, the 1991 semi final and the 1994 preliminary final. West Coast won three of those four games.

Scoreboard

Week four (grand final)

References

External links

AFL finals series official website

Finals Series, 2018